The 2020 Arab Club Champions Cup Final was the final match of the 2019–20 Arab Club Champions Cup, the 29th season of the Arab League's main club football tournament organised by UAFA, and the 2nd season since it was renamed from the Arab Club Championship to the Arab Club Champions Cup. It was played at the Prince Moulay Abdellah Stadium in Rabat.  The match was originally scheduled to be played in 2020 but due was delayed due to the COVID-19 pandemic which caused postponements during the semi final stage of the competition.  Moroccan club Raja CA beat Saudi side Al-Ittihad Jeddah 4–3 on penalties after a 4–4 draw to earn their second Arab Club Champions Cup title.

Teams

Venue
On 16 April 2018, the then-president of UAFA Turki Al-Sheikh announced that the Prince Moulay Abdellah Stadium would host the final of the tournament for this season. This was the first UAFA club competition final hosted at the stadium. The stadium was selected as a venue for many tournaments held in Morocco; most recently the 2019 African Games.

The Prince Moulay Abdellah Stadium was built in 1983 and its current capacity is 53,000. It is used by the Morocco national football team and ASFAR as a home stadium.

Route to the final

Both clubs entered the Arab Club Champions Cup at the Round of 32 stage of the competition with the draw made on 27 July 2019. Al-Ittihad Jeddah entered from the Asia Zone with Raja C2 entering from the Africa Zone.

Match

Details
The "home" team (for administrative purposes) was determined by an additional draw held after the semi-final draw.

References

External links
 

2020
Final
August 2021 sports events in Africa
2020
International club association football competitions hosted by Morocco
21st century in Rabat
21st century in Morocco
2019–20 in Moroccan football